Tyree Washington (born August 28, 1976) is a retired American sprinter.

Born in Riverside, California, Washington attended both La Sierra High School and San Bernardino Valley College.

His coach during 2003 was Antonio Pettigrew, who ran alongside Washington, Michael Johnson and Jerome Young in breaking the 4 × 400 metres world record in 1998 with a time of 2:54.20. However, both Young and Pettigrew were later found to have violated doping regulations during their careers, and the IAAF now list the 1993 US quartet of Andrew Valmon, Quincy Watts, Butch Reynolds and Michael Johnson as the world record holders.

At the 2003 World Championships, Washington originally finished first in the 4 × 400 metres relay with Young, Calvin Harrison and Derrick Brew; and second in the 400 m behind Young. Calvin Harrison was found guilty of a doping violation (modafinil) in June 2003, leading to the quartet being stripped of the 4 × 400 m medals. Young was given a lifetime ban for a second offence in 2004; this was applied retrospectively to 1999 (Young's first failed test) in 2008, leading to Washington being awarded the gold medal.

His last major win was at the 2006 world indoor championships. He retired in 2008 after failing to qualify at the US Olympic trials.

Achievements

Personal bests

 All information from IAAF Profile

Competition record
1997 Junior College State Champion 400 meters (Fresno, Ca); Junior College State Champion 400 meters (Fresno, Ca); Junior College State Record Holder 200 meters; Junior College State Record Holder 400 meters; Junior College National Record Holder 400 meters (Bakersfield, Ca).
World Championships – Athens, Greece.
400 m bronze medal
4 × 400 m relay gold medal
1998 Goodwill Games Silver medalist 400 meters (New York); Goodwill Games Silver medalist 200 meters (New York)
2003
World Championships – Paris, France.
400 m gold medal (originally silver before the disqualification of his best friend Young for a doping violation)
4 × 400 m relay disqualified due to a doping of one of his teammates (originally gold medal)
IAAF World Indoor Championships – Birmingham, England.
 400 m gold medal
 4 × 400 m relay gold medal
 2005 World Athletic Final 400 meter Champion (Monte Carlo)
2006
IAAF World Indoor Championships – Moscow, Russia.
4 × 400 m relay gold medal

He ran the fastest time in 2001 (44.28 seconds) and again in 2003 (44.33 seconds).

Notes

References

External links

Tyree Washington at USATF

1976 births
Living people
People from Murrieta, California
Sportspeople from Riverside, California
Track and field athletes from California
American male sprinters
Competitors at the 1998 Goodwill Games
Goodwill Games medalists in athletics
World Athletics Championships athletes for the United States
World Athletics Championships winners
World Athletics Championships medalists
World Athletics Indoor Championships winners
USA Outdoor Track and Field Championships winners
USA Indoor Track and Field Championships winners
African-American male track and field athletes
San Bernardino Valley College alumni
Junior college men's track and field athletes in the United States
21st-century African-American sportspeople
20th-century African-American sportspeople